George Segal (November 26, 1924 – June 9, 2000) was an American painter and sculptor associated with the pop art movement.  He was presented with the United States National Medal of Arts in 1999.

Works

Although Segal started his art career as a painter, his best known works are cast life-size figures and the tableaux the figures inhabited. In place of traditional casting techniques, Segal pioneered the use of plaster bandages (plaster-impregnated gauze strips designed for making orthopedic casts) as a sculptural medium. In this process, he first wrapped a model with bandages in sections, then removed the hardened forms and put them back together with more plaster to form a hollow shell. These forms were not used as molds; the shell itself became the final sculpture, including the rough texture of the bandages. Initially, Segal kept the sculptures stark white, but a few years later he began painting them, usually in bright monochrome colors. Eventually he started having the final forms cast in bronze, sometimes patinated white to resemble the original plaster.

Segal's figures have minimal color and detail, which give them a ghostly, melancholic appearance. In larger works, one or more figures are placed in anonymous, typically urban environments such as a street corner, bus, or diner. In contrast to the figures, the environments were built using found objects.

Life
Segal was born in New York; his Jewish parents were immigrants from Eastern Europe. His parents ran a butcher shop in the Bronx, then moved to a poultry farm in New Jersey where Segal grew up. He attended Stuyvesant High School, as well as the Pratt Institute, the Cooper Union, and New York University, from which he graduated in 1949 with a teaching degree. In 1946, he married Helen Steinberg and they bought another chicken farm in South Brunswick, New Jersey, where he lived for the rest of his life. 

During the few years he ran the chicken farm, Segal held annual picnics at the site to which he invited his friends from the New York art world. His proximity to central New Jersey fostered friendships with professors from the Rutgers University art department. Segal introduced several Rutgers professors to John Cage, and took part in Cage's legendary experimental composition classes. Allan Kaprow coined the term happening to describe the art performances that took place on Segal's farm in the Spring of 1957. Events for Yam Festival also took place there. After his death on June 9, 2000, he was interred at Washington Cemetery in South Brunswick, New Jersey.

His widow, Helen Segal, kept his memory and works alive, until her death in 2014, through the George and Helen Segal Foundation. The foundation continues this mission. George and Helen had three children.

Notable works

 The Truck (1966)
 The Billboard (1966) - included in the Governor Nelson A. Rockefeller Empire State Plaza Art Collection, Albany, NY
 The Laundromat (1966–67)
 The Costume Party (1965–72) – housed at the Solomon R. Guggenheim Museum
 Parking Garage (1968) - installed at the Paul Robeson Library at Rutgers University-Camden
  Hot Dog Stand (1978) - installed at the San Francisco Museum of Modern Art
 Abraham and Isaac (1978–79) – commissioned in memory of the 1970 Kent State shootings; housed at Princeton University's Modern Sculpture Garden
 Gay Liberation (1980) – commissioned in memory of the 1969 Stonewall riots; the first piece of public art dedicated to LGBT rights; two castings, one now housed at the Gay Liberation Monument, Christopher Street Park, Manhattan; the other at Stanford University's Main Quad
 The Commuters (1982) – installed in the New York City Port Authority Bus Terminal
 Japanese Couple against a Brick Wall (1982) – Honolulu Museum of Art
 Holocaust Memorial at California Palace of the Legion of Honor (1984) in San Francisco
 Abraham's Farewell to Ishmael (1987), presented at the Pérez Art Museum Miami between 2019-2023.
 Chance Meeting (1991) – installed on campus of the University of Hawaii at ManoaDepression Bread Line (1991) - installed in the rooftop Sculpture Garden of the Madison Museum of Contemporary Art (Madison, WI)
 Street Crossing (1992) – installed in the College Avenue Promenade at Montclair State University

Recognition

 The George Segal Gallery at Montclair State University opened in spring 2006.
 His collected papers are housed in the Princeton University Library.

Honors and awards
 (1992) Lifetime Achievement in Contemporary Sculpture Award, International Sculpture Center, Hamilton, New Jersey, United States ;
 (1997) Praemium Imperiale, Japan ;
 (1999) National Medal of Arts, United States .

Films
Segal's legs appeared in John Lennon and Yoko Ono's 1971 film Up Your Legs Forever.George Segal (1980).  Directed by Michael Blackwood.  Documentary about Segal, who discusses and is shown creating his bronze sculpture Abraham and Isaac, which was originally intended as a memorial for the Kent State shootings of 1970.George Segal: American Still Life'' (2001). Directed by Amber Edwards. Television documentary about his life and work.

See also

 Environmental sculpture
 Happening
 List of Jewish American visual artists
 List of sculptors
 John De Andrea
 Duane Hanson
 Edward Kienholz
 Ron Mueck

References
Notes

Bibliography
Busch, Julia M. (1974). A Decade of Sculpture: The New Media in the 1960s. The Art Alliance Press: Philadelphia; Associated University Presses: London. .

External links 

 George and Helen Segal Foundation
 The George Segal Papers at Princeton University
 “Abraham and Isaac”, Princeton University Retrieved April 21, 2011
 The Commuters, Port Authority Bus Terminal, New York City Retrieved April 21, 2011
 George Segal – Time magazine "Machine of the Year: The Computer Moves In" (January 3, 1983]
 George Segal – "Portraits in Plaster". The Baltimore Museum of Art: Baltimore, Maryland, 1967  Retrieved June 26, 2012

1924 births
2000 deaths
20th-century American sculptors
20th-century American male artists
American male sculptors
Jewish sculptors
Jewish American artists
American pop artists
Artists from New York City
Cooper Union alumni
American male artists
Modern artists
New York University alumni
Artists from New Brunswick, New Jersey
People from South Brunswick, New Jersey
Pratt Institute alumni
Stuyvesant High School alumni
Recipients of the Praemium Imperiale

United States National Medal of Arts recipients
Levites
Sculptors from New York (state)
Sculptors from New Jersey